The London and Home Counties Joint Electricity Authority was a United Kingdom statutory body established in 1925 with the responsibility to "provide or secure the provision of a cheap and abundant supply of electricity” within the County of London and parts of the surrounding home counties. The Authority acquired electricity in bulk from electricity undertakings for distribution, and operated some power stations in Surrey. The Authority was abolished upon nationalisation of the British electricity industry in 1948.

Establishment 
The Electricity (Supply) Act 1919 (9 &10 Geo. 5 c.100) had established the Electricity Commissioners with the aim to consider schemes for the centralisation of electricity supplies in a small number of large generating stations owned by joint electricity authorities (JEA). The London and Home Counties JEA was established in 1925 under the provisions of the 1919 Act and the Electricity (Supply) Act 1922 (12 & 13 Geo. 5. c. 46). Its role was to ensure the provision of a cheap and abundant supply of electricity in London and the home counties.

Constitution 
The London and Home Counties JEA formally comprised 36 members as follows: 

 Local authority electricity undertakings (in County of London): 8
 Local authority electricity undertakings (outside county): 5
 West Ham Corporation: 1
 The 10 electricity companies, see note below: 1
 The 4 electricity companies, see note below: 1
 Other electricity companies (Kent, North Metropolitan, etc): 1
 Other electricity companies: 2
 London County Council: 6
 Middlesex County Council: 1
 Other County Councils: 2
 Corporation of London: 1
 Workers in the industry: 2
 Railway companies: 2
 Former electricity supply authorities: 3

Note. Ten electricity companies, mainly in West London, had amalgamated in 1925, under the provisions of the London Electricity (No.2) Act 1925. Similarly in East London four companies had amalgamated under the London Electricity (No.1) Act 1925.

The London JEA appointed a chairman and vice-chairman from its members. The first chairman of the JEA was Sir George Hume (1925 to 1926), and the first vice-chairman was Clement Attlee. Later chairmen were Sir Duncan Watson (from 1926), William Francis Marchant (in 1931 and 1933), Alderman B. J. Samels (1933), James Chuter Ede (1934 to 1940), Alderman Dudley Stuart (from 1940), and H. E. Goodrich (1947). The joint electricity authority’s headquarters was originally at 5 Millbank, London, SW1, from 1936 it was at 5-6 Lancaster Place, Strand, London WC2.

District 
The London JEA supply district covered 1,841 square miles including the whole of the counties of London and Middlesex, and parts of Hertfordshire, Essex, Kent, Surrey, Buckinghamshire, and Berkshire. The district extended from Eton in the west to Billericay in the east and from Dorking in the south to Welwyn in the north. The population served by the authority in 1931 was 9,088,764.

Operations 
The JEA's powers to purchase land and construct generating stations were extended by the London and Home Counties Joint Electricity Authority Act 1927 (17 & 18 Geo. 5 Ch. cix.).

The amount of electricity sold by undertakings agreed to be purchased by the JEA was:

In 1932 there were 83 authorised undertakers in the district comprising the JEA itself, 44 local authority and 38 companies.

Companies in the London area were required to notify the JEA of any proposal to spend any capital exceeding £5,000 on assets 

The London JEA intended to build a large power station at Chiswick, however the Central Electricity Board rejected the scheme and instead proposed the expansion of Fulham power station which was nearer to the centre of load. 

By 1932 the London JEA had acquired the following undertakings: Callender's (Surbiton), Edmundson's (Dorking), Leatherhead and District, South Metropolitan Tramways, Twickenham and Teddington, and Urban (Weybridge).

In 1937 the London JEA sold 395,195 MWh of electricity, revenue from these sales was £1,357,974. Costs were £1,149,252 making a surplus of £208,720.

The London JEA was empowered to purchase the assets of any electricity company in its area in 1971.

Abolition 
The London JEA was abolished in 1948 under the provisions of the Electricity Act 1947 which nationalised British electricity industry. The JEA’s assets were split between the South Eastern Electricity Board, the Eastern Electricity Board and the London Electricity Board.

References

Energy companies established in 1925